This is a list of the busiest airports in the European Union (EU), based on various ranking criteria: number of passengers in any given year (2016 to 2021), number of passengers by route type, and highest number of passengers for each largest national airport within the EU.

Statistics

Busiest airports by number of passengers

2021
The table below reproduces the 50 airports in the European Union with most passengers traveling through them, either arriving, departing, or in transit, and is based on official Eurostat data for the year 2021. Numbers provided by airports to Eurostat might slightly differ from numbers publicized by airports.

2020

2019

2018

2017

2016

Busiest EU airports by route type

National (Domestic) 

This list shows Eurostat data for the airports which had the most passengers taking national (domestic) flights in 2021 within EU countries (i.e. passengers traveling from Paris to Marseille).

Intra-EU 
This list shows Eurostat data for the airports which had the most passengers taking international intra-EU flights in 2019 (i.e. passengers traveling from Frankfurt to Barcelona, but not from Madrid to Barcelona).

Extra-EU 
This list shows Eurostat data for the airports which had the most passengers taking international extra-EU flights in 2021 (i.e. passengers traveling from New York to Paris).

Busiest airport in each EU member state

Gallery

See also

Lists by EU member state

Other

Notes

References

Europe
 
Aviation in Europe
 Busiest